Roberto Emiliano Camargo Rodríguez (15 June 1917 – 4 November 2007) was a Colombian épée and foil fencer. He competed at the 1948 and 1956 Summer Olympics.

References

1917 births
2007 deaths
Sportspeople from Bogotá
Colombian male foil fencers
Olympic fencers of Colombia
Fencers at the 1948 Summer Olympics
Fencers at the 1956 Summer Olympics
Colombian male épée fencers
20th-century Colombian people